Lars Lystad is a Norwegian ski-orienteering competitor and world champion. He won a gold medal in the relay event at the World Ski Orienteering Championships in Batak in 1986, together with Sigurd Dæhli, Audun Knutsen and Vidar Benjaminsen, and again in Val di Non in 1994, with Kjetil Ulven, Harald Svergja and Vidar Benjaminsen. He received a silver medal in the long distance in 1994.

He finished second in the overall World Cup in Ski Orienteering in 1993.

References

Year of birth missing (living people)
Living people
Norwegian orienteers
Male orienteers
Ski-orienteers
20th-century Norwegian people